Youghal is a town in County Cork, Ireland.

Youghal may also refer to:

Youghal (Parliament of Ireland constituency)
Youghal (townland), a townland in County Tipperary, Ireland
Youghal (UK Parliament constituency)
Youghal GAA, a GAA club in the town of Youghal
Youghal Greyhound Stadium
Youghal International College
Youghal Priory

See also